William Paul "Dutch" Fehring (May 31, 1912— April 13, 2006) was an American football and baseball player and coach. He served as the head baseball coach at Purdue University from 1936 to 1942 and at Stanford University from 1956 to 1967, compiling a career college baseball record of 374–248–9.

Early life
Born in Columbus, Indiana, Fehring attended Purdue University, where he starred in football, basketball, and baseball, one of only two Purdue athletes to letter nine times. Fehring helped the Boilermakers win two Big Ten Conference titles in football and a national championship in basketball in 1932, and was the traveling roommate of John Wooden. Fehring was inducted into the inaugural class of the Purdue University Athletic Hall of Fame in 1994.

Baseball career
After graduating from Purdue, Fehring chose to play his favorite sport, baseball, where he excelled as a catcher. He was signed by the Chicago White Sox and made a single major league appearance, in a road game against the New York Yankees at Yankee Stadium on July 25, 1934. Fehring entered the game in the bottom of the seventh inning to catch, with the Yankees leading 10–2. During that inning, Lou Gehrig attempted an inside-the-park home run on a ball hit to center field; the ball was relayed to Fehring, who tagged Gehrig out at the plate. Gehrig was credited with a triple on the play; he had already hit a home run, single, and double in the game, thus it became the first time that Gehrig hit for the cycle in his career. Fehring had one at bat during the game, striking out in the ninth inning.

Coaching career
After his baseball career ended, Fehring returned to Purdue and became their head baseball coach and assistant football coach from 1936 to 1942. After serving in World War II, Fehring was an assistant football coach for two years at Oklahoma and for one year at UCLA, where he recommended his college friend John Wooden for the head basketball coaching vacancy.

Stanford
In 1949, Fehring was hired as an assistant baseball and football coach at Stanford. He took over as head baseball coach in 1956, and coached for 11 years, culminating in a College World Series semifinals appearance in 1967. Along with his football coaching role in the 1952 Rose Bowl, Fehring has the unique distinction as a coach in both a College World Series and a Rose Bowl. He also served as an assistant coach for the United States team that played baseball at the 1964 Summer Olympics as a demonstration sport in Tokyo.

Later life and honors
Fehring retired as head baseball coach in 1967, but remained at Stanford as director of intramurals and club sports until 1977. Fehring died in Palo Alto, California, in 2006 at the age of 93.

Fehring is an inductee of the American Baseball Coaches Association Hall of Fame, the Indiana Baseball Hall of Fame, the Indiana Basketball Hall of Fame, the Purdue University Athletic Hall of Fame, and the Stanford Athletic Hall of Fame.

References

Further reading

External links
 
 

1912 births
2006 deaths
American football tackles
American men's basketball players
Major League Baseball catchers
Chicago White Sox players
Oklahoma Sooners football coaches
Purdue Boilermakers baseball coaches
Purdue Boilermakers baseball players
Purdue Boilermakers football coaches
Purdue Boilermakers football players
Purdue Boilermakers men's basketball players
Stanford Cardinal baseball coaches
Stanford Cardinal football coaches
UCLA Bruins football coaches
People from Columbus, Indiana
Players of American football from Indiana
Baseball players from Indiana
Basketball players from Indiana